Joe Davison (29 July 1919 – 1983) was an English footballer who made 240 appearances in the Football League playing as a full back for Darlington in the years following the Second World War. He was born in Newcastle upon Tyne, and also played non-league football for Throckley Welfare and North Shields.

References

1919 births
1983 deaths
Footballers from Newcastle upon Tyne
English footballers
Association football defenders
Darlington F.C. players
North Shields F.C. players
English Football League players
Date of death missing
Place of death missing
Throckley Welfare F.C. players